The 2016–17 Biathlon World Cup – World Cup 3  was held in Nove Mesto, Czech Republic, from 15 December until 18 December 2016.

Schedule of events

Medal winners

Men

Women

Achievements

 Best performance for all time

 , 5th place in Sprint
 , 13th place in Sprint
 , 1st place in Sprint
 , 1st place in Pursuit

 First World Cup race

 , 61st place in Sprint
 , 90th place in Sprint
 , 91st place in Sprint
 , 92nd place in Sprint
 , 6th place in Mass Start
 , 69th place in Sprint

References 

2016–17 Biathlon World Cup
Biathlon World Cup
Biathlon World Cup - World Cup 3
Biathlon competitions in the Czech Republic